Substrate adhesion molecules (SAMs) are proteins that attach cells to specific compounds in the extracellular matrix (a process known as cell adhesion).

Some of the amino acids in the SAM bind to components of the extracellular matrix, while others bind to integrins on the surface of the cell. Integrin molecules are composed of two chains of amino acids, one of which is connected to the actin filaments in the cytoskeleton, while the other is connected to the SAMs. This enables external activity in the extracellular matrix to affect the shape and movement of the cell.

SAMs do not have to be made by the cells that bind to them. They can also link to other SAMs, influencing each other's behavior.

There is very strong evidence SAMs also have a key role in neuronal morphogenesis.

See also
 Cell adhesion molecules
 Fibronectin
 Laminin

References

Further reading

 
 

Cell biology
Proteins